Cole Point is a headland at the south end of Dean Island, which lies within the Getz Ice Shelf just off the coast of Marie Byrd Land. It was mapped by the United States Geological Survey from surveys and from U.S. Navy air photos, 1959–65, and named by the Advisory Committee on Antarctic Names for Lawrence M. Cole, U.S. Navy, a builder at Byrd Station, 1969.

References
 

Headlands of Marie Byrd Land